"Waterfall" is the ninth single from The Stone Roses. The fourth single taken from their debut album The Stone Roses, it was released in 1991 and reached number 27 in the UK Singles Chart.

The song was placed at number 5 in a 2013 poll, by readers of The Guardian, of their "all-time favourite songs by the band."

Track listing
7" vinyl (Silvertone ORE 35)
Cassette (Silvertone ORE C 35)
 "Waterfall" – 3:31
 "One Love" – 3:40

12" vinyl (Silvertone ORE T 35)
 "Waterfall" – 5:23
 "One Love" – 7:10

CD (Silvertone ORE CD 35)
 "Waterfall (7" version)" – 3:31
 "One Love (7" version)" – 3:40
 "Waterfall (12" version)" – 5:23
 "One Love (12" version)" – 7:10

Certifications

References

External links
The Definitive Stone Roses Discography entry

1989 songs
1991 singles
Song recordings produced by John Leckie
Songs written by Ian Brown
Songs written by John Squire
The Stone Roses songs